{{Automatic taxobox
| image = Aplysina archeri (Stove-pipe Sponge-pink variation).jpg
| image_alt = "Aplysina archeri"
| image_caption = Aplysina archeri
| taxon = Aplysina
| authority = Nardo, 1834
| subdivision_ranks = Species
| subdivision = See text
| synonyms = 
 Aplysia Nardo, 1833
 Luffaria Duchassaing & Michelotti, 1864 
 Verongia Bowerbank, 1845
}}Aplysina is a genus of sea sponges in the order Verongiida. It was first authenticated and described by Giovanni Domenico Nardo in 1834.

Species
The following species are recognised in the genus Aplysina'':

References

Sponge genera
Verongimorpha
Taxa named by Giovanni Domenico Nardo